Paul C. Lafond (July 12, 1919 – May 27, 1988) was a Canadian politician.

Born in Hull, Quebec (now Gatineau, Quebec), he served with the Royal Canadian Air Force as an officer during World War II. He was awarded the Distinguished Flying Cross in 1944 for his part in sinking a German submarine in the Atlantic. After the war, he was executive secretary of the Liberal Party of Canada and worked for the Liberal Federation of Canada from 1948 to 1968.

He was summoned to the Senate of Canada on the advice of Pierre Trudeau representing the senatorial division of Gulf, Quebec in 1970. He was chairman of the Special Senate Committee on National Defence.

He died in office in 1988.

References
 
 Paul Lafond fonds - Library and Archives Canada
 

1919 births
1988 deaths
Canadian senators from Quebec
Liberal Party of Canada senators
Politicians from Gatineau